La Pobla de Vallbona is a municipality in the province of Valencia in the Valencian Community, Spain.

History of the shield of La Pobla de Vallbona

The shield of La Pobla de Vallbona was mainly created to avoid fraud and mistakes with documents or authorizations that each mayor of the towns of Spain issued. In 1848 the government implied as an obligation to use a stamp  (shield) with the goal of not confusing documents. This is when La Pobla de Vallbona decided to use the shield that has been used since 1975.
The shield is divided in three parts. The first part that is the largest has the 4 bars of Aragón; thus this shows that the origins of the town were established taking into account Aragón’s costumes. Then, there are two smaller divisions one have 3 “moreras” of sinople (three green trees); representing how abundant is the town with trees and agriculture. The last division has a blue background that indicates loyalty and also there is the “caserio de plata” (some kind of houses) that makes reference of the name “Pobla” that is the unique characteristic of the vallbonenses: Loyalty. Lastly, one can see at the top the Royal Crown.

Geography
 
Access to La Pobla de Vallbona can be either through the highway CV-35 or also through the Valencia Metro line 1.

Neighborhoods
 
In the municipality of La Pobla de Vallbona besides the urban core one can also found the following towns:
Casa Blanca
Camp del Túria 
Gallipont
La Conarda
Pla dels Aljubs
Rascanya

Economy

After the highway with access to Valencia was finished, the population almost doubled due to the proximity to the city. In general, this increased the local trade in the town. Additionally, the agriculture in the town throughout years has been abandoned. But, recently new farmers have been arriving and enriching the fields. Despite their small size, fields attract many visitors because they afford pleasant walks through crops such as oranges, orchards, mandarins, artichokes, onions and olives.

Monuments

In La Pobla de Vallbona significant historical monuments include:

“Ermita de San Sebastian” (sculpture)

“Ermita Mas de Tous” (sculpture)

“Iglesia Santiago Apostol” (church)

“Iglesia de la Santísima Trinidad y San José” (church)

“La Casa Bernal” (house)

“La Casa Gran” (house)

Sports

Football
La Pobla de Vallbona has a futbol club named “Atletico Vallbonense”. This club is recognized among the entire region because they have many teams in minor divisions that have made to the leagues. This team is usually small and since 2002 has been in category 2B.
       
Basketball
The club of Basketball in la Pobla has a school funded recently. Nevertheless, it has been growing and it probably becomes a recognized team.

Valencian pilota
La Pobla has been home to prominent players of the raspall variant of the game, among them Hector Coll Sebastia (Colau) and Pasqual Balaguer Catillo (Pasqual II). The town's trinquet is one of the stop-overs of the annual Professional League tour.

References

Municipalities in Camp de Túria
Populated places in Camp de Túria